Slaughter is a town in East Feliciana Parish, Louisiana, United States. The population was 997 at the 2010 U.S. census, down from 1,011 at the 2000 U.S. census. At the 2020 population estimates program, the U.S. Census Bureau estimated 882 people lived in the township. Slaughter is part of the Baton Rouge metropolitan statistical area.

History
The name of the town is from a Illinois Central Railroad Depot for a pig slaughter house.   figures in the title of Michael Ondaatje's novel about legendary jazz player Buddy Bolden: Coming Through Slaughter. Slaughter was designated a town in 2002.

Geography
Slaughter is located along the southern edge of East Feliciana Parish at  (30.716484, -91.144506). The town is bordered on the south by the city of Zachary in East Baton Rouge Parish.

Louisiana Highway 19 passes through Slaughter, leading north  to Wilson and south  to Baton Rouge.

Demographics

As of the 2020 United States census, there were 1,035 people, 435 households, and 298 families residing in the town. At the 2019 American Community Survey, 87.6% of the population were non-Hispanic white, 8.0% Black and African American, 1.4% two or more races, and 3.1% Hispanic and Latin American of any race. The town had a median age of 48.1.

At the 2000 U.S. census, there were 1,011 people, 359 households, and 286 families residing in the village. The racial makeup of the village was 94.56% White, 3.56% African American, 0.99% Native American, 0.10% Asian, 0.40% from other races, and 0.40% from two or more races. Hispanic or Latino of any race were 0.79% of the population.

There were 359 households, out of which 38.2% had children under the age of 18 living with them, 64.6% were married couples living together, 8.9% had a female householder with no husband present, and 20.1% were non-families. 16.7% of all households were made up of individuals, and 7.5% had someone living alone who was 65 years of age or older. The average household size was 2.82 and the average family size was 3.17.

In the village the population was spread out, with 28.8% under the age of 18, 7.9% from 18 to 24, 30.8% from 25 to 44, 24.8% from 45 to 64, and 7.7% who were 65 years of age or older. The median age was 33 years. For every 100 females, there were 101.8 males. For every 100 females age 18 and over, there were 98.3 males.

The median income for a household in the village was $44,896, and the median income for a family was $46,932. Males had a median income of $34,375 versus $21,141 for females. The per capita income for the village was $17,457. About 3.4% of families and 3.5% of the population were below the poverty line, including 3.1% of those under age 18 and 5.7% of those age 65 or over.

Education
East Feliciana Parish School Board serves Slaughter. Slaughter Elementary School and Slaughter Community Charter School are located in Slaughter.

References

Towns in Louisiana
Towns in East Feliciana Parish, Louisiana
Baton Rouge metropolitan area